A demand-side platform (DSP) is a system that allows buyers of digital advertising inventory to manage multiple ad exchange and data exchange accounts through one interface. Real-time bidding for displaying online advertising takes place within the ad exchanges, and by utilizing a DSP, marketers can manage their bids for the banners and the pricing for the data that they are layering on to target their audiences. Much like Paid Search, using DSPs allows users to optimize based on set Key Performance Indicators such as effective cost per click (eCPC), and effective cost per action (eCPA). 

The functionality of the DSP often depends on the format of the media. For example, DSPs that advertise online can see how people behave after viewing an ad, whereas this is not be possible in outdoor advertising  or television and radio, where the advertising constitutes a one-to-many approach.

DSPs incorporate many of the facets previously offered by advertising networks, such as wide access to inventory and vertical and lateral targeting, with the ability to serve ads, real-time bid on ads, track the ads, and optimize. This is all kept within one interface that allows advertisers to control and maximize the impact of their ads. DSPs track frequency information, several forms of rich media ads, and some video metrics. Many third parties are integrating with DSPs to provide better tracking. In addition, DSPs use advanced price reduction algorithms, commonly known as bid shading, to help advertisers procure ad impressions for a lower CPM in the first-price auction.

DSPs are commonly used for retargeting, as it is able to see a large volume of inventory in order to recognize an ad call with a user that an advertiser is trying to reach. The percentage of bids that are won over the bids that were submitted zero no marketing and no access given .

Types of programmatic buys 
 Preferred deal: No auction, set CPM, non-guaranteed inventory
 Programmatic guaranteed: No auction, set CPM, guaranteed inventory
 Private marketplace (PMP): Real time bidding, price floor, select group of advertisers
 Open exchange buy: Real time bidding, variable CPM, open to all advertisers

Examples

See also
 Ad exchange
 Supply-side platform
 Ad serving
 Header bidding

Notes

Online advertising
Marketing techniques